Las Ketchup is a Spanish girl group founded by flamenco record producer Manuel "Queco" Ruiz. The group, which consists of sisters Lucía, Lola, and Pilar Muñoz (later to be joined by a fourth sister Rocío), is best known for the 2002 hit single, "The Ketchup Song (Aserejé)", a single that sold over seven million copies worldwide. The group's debut studio album, Hijas del Tomate, has sold over two million copies worldwide, but the second did not achieve the same success. 

They represented Spain at Eurovision Song Contest 2006 in Athens with the song "Un Blodymary". The group has not released any singles since 2006, but still performs together publicly around Spain and other countries.

History

2001–2002: Formation
All members of the group are daughters of flamenco musician Juan Manuel Muñoz Expósito, best known by his stage name, El Tomate (Spanish for "The Tomato").

Las Ketchup were originally discovered by the flamenco record producer Manuel "Queco" Ruiz, who signed them to his newly formed, independent Córdoba label Shaketown Music, that he ran together with Manuel Illán.

2002–2005: Hijas del Tomate
In the middle of 2002, they had a major flamenco Europop fusion hit with "Aserejé" (released as "The Ketchup Song" in the United States, the United Kingdom and other countries), which reached the top of the charts in many countries, including: Spain, Portugal, Colombia, the United Kingdom, Italy, Japan, Albania, France, Finland, Turkey, Syria, Sweden, Norway, Belgium, the Netherlands, the Philippines, Switzerland, Germany, Romania, and Australia. However, it failed to hit the top 40 on the U.S. Billboard Hot 100. The title and part of the lyrics were in Spanish. The hit also had an accompanying dance. The second single was "Kusha Las Payas" and garnered moderate success. The group re-released "The Ketchup Song" later in the same year, with a new video, as a Christmas song.

2006: Un Blodymary and addition of Rocío
The group took an extended absence from the public eye to write songs for a new album and, during the same period, Pilar had a baby. In 2006, they were joined by Rocío, a fourth sister, and came back as a four girl group to represent Spain in the Eurovision Song Contest 2006. The girls said themselves that Rocío had always been a member of "Las Ketchup", but that had not appeared in the promo material or performances because she was pregnant. They released their second studio album, titled Un Blodymary. The album release was delayed until the beginning of 2006. They planned to release one million copies and their record producer Queco, who also produced and wrote their worldwide single, "Aserejé", indicated that the album displayed their original sound.  Their first single from the album was also titled "Un Blodymary" for the Spanish entry in the Eurovision Song Contest 2006. The song finished twenty-first with only 18 points.

2006–present
In 2016, the group performed their hit "The Ketchup Song (Aserejé)" as an interval during the first semi final of the Swedish pre-selection to the Eurovision Song Contest, Melodifestivalen. In 2017, they performed at the Pal Norte in Monterrey, Mexico.

Discography

Albums

Singles

As lead artist

As featured artist

Awards

2002 Ondas Awards

– Best New Artist/Group

2004 Billboard Latin Music Awards

– Best Pop Album from the New Generation (Hijas del Tomate)

– Most Played Tropical-Salsa Song by a Duo or Group ("The Ketchup Song (Aserejé)")

2003 Latin Grammy Award

– Best Pop Album By a Duo or Group with Vocals Hijas del Tomate (Nominated, lost to Bacilos's Caraluna.)

2003 MIDEM (Cannes)

– Best New Artist/Group

2003 Amigo Awards

– Best New Group

– Best New Artist

2004 MIDEM (Cannes)

– Border Breakers (Best-selling album out of its country and within Europe with Hijas del Tomate)

Parodies
In 2002, the German comedian Elmar Brandt wrote (using the tune of Aserejé) a Gerhard Schröder parody called "Der Steuersong" (The Tax Song) for the radio program The Gerd Show.

In 2002, a satirical version to the tune of Aserejé by El Grupo Mayonesa circulated in Gibraltar prior to the referendum on a proposal of joint sovereignty, entitled 'Vota Que No, Que No, Que No No No'

In 2003, the Slovak fictional musical duo Krímeš performed in TV show Uragán a satirical version to the tune of Aserejé called "Sereme" (We're Shi*ting).

See also
 Son de Sol

References

People from Córdoba, Spain
Spanish dance music groups
Eurovision Song Contest entrants for Spain
Eurovision Song Contest entrants of 2006
Sibling musical groups
Spanish girl groups
Musical groups established in 2002
Spanish pop music groups
2002 establishments in Spain
Latin pop music groups
Women in Latin music